The Gold Medal of Military Valour is an Italian medal established on 21 May 1793 by King Victor Amadeus III of Sardinia for deeds of outstanding gallantry in war by junior officers and soldiers.

The face of the medal displayed the profile of the king, and on its reverse was a flag decoration and the words "for valour"

On 14 August 1815, Victor Emmanuel I of Sardinia replaced it with the Military Order of Savoy, now known as the Military Order of Italy.

Charles Albert of Sardinia revived it on 26 March 1833, and added to it the Silver and bronze medals. These had, on their faces, the coat of arms of Savoy with laurel branches, the royal crown, and the words "for military valor". On the reverse were two laurel branches enclosing the name of the decorated soldier, and the place and date of the action.

With the proclamation of the Republic on 2 June 1946, the coat of arms of the House of Savoy was replaced with the emblem of the Italian Republic.

For actions performed by individuals during World War I, the Gold Medal was awarded some 368 times, as well as 37 times to military units, and once to the Unknown Soldier. Only four of the individual awards went to foreigners, one of these being Czar Nicholas II of Russia. The other three were for acts of gallantry in which the recipient was killed in action or died from his injuries (the Frenchmen John O'Byrne and Roland Morillot, and the American Coleman deWitt). The Gold Medal of Military Valor was one of the most parsimoniously awarded medals of World War I, granted less frequently than even the Victoria Cross which was awarded 628 times.

During World War II the medal was awarded to soldiers of the Royal Italian Army; after these forces were reorganized following the Armistice with Italy in 1943, it was awarded to members of the Allies-supporting Italian Co-Belligerent forces. The Axis-affiliated Italian Social Republic created another design of the medal, with a Gladius replacing the arms of Savoy, for members of the Esercito Nazionale Repubblicano from 1943 to 1945. This version of the award was not given recognition by the postwar Italian government.

The Gold Medal for Military Valor is still awarded by the Italian state, and it, along with Silver and bronze medals for Military Valor as well as the War Cross of Military Valour (which can only be awarded in time of war) was established by the Royal Decree of 4 November 1932, in which the purpose of these medals is defined as, "to distinguish and publicly honor the authors of heroic military acts, even ones performed in time of peace, provided that the exploit is closely connected with the purposes for which the Armed Forces are constituted, whatever may be the condition or quality of the author."

Notable recipients
The first recipient was Domenico Millelire of the Royal Sardinian Navy on 6 April 1793 and the latest recipient was in 2014 Chief Corporal-Major Andrea Adorno of the 4th Alpini Paratroopers Regiment for combat operations in Bala Murghab, Afghanistan in 2010.

Individuals 

 Cesare Airaghi
 Abele Ambrosini
 Irma Bandiera
 Francesco Baracca
 Cesare Battisti
 Giuseppe Baudoin
 Emanuele Beraudo di Pralormo
 Annibale Bergonzoli
 Edoardo Bianchini
 Carmelo Borg Pisani
 Junio Valerio Borghese
 Carlo Emanuele Buscaglia
 Giuseppe Caimi
 Nicola Calipari
 Inigo Campioni
 Carla Capponi
 Salvo D'Acquisto
 Francesco De Rosa
 Furio Niclot Doglio
 Luigi Durand de la Penne
 Unatù Endisciau, the only native soldier awarded the Gold Medal
 Emilio Faà di Bruno
 Carlo Fecia di Cossato
 Giovanni Fornasini
 Giuseppe Galliano (twice awarded)
 Joaquín García Morato
 Maurizio Giglio
 Luigi Giorgi (twice awarded)
 Luigi Gorrini
 Giuliano Gozi
 Amedeo Guillet
 Charles Yorke, 4th Earl of Hardwicke
 Filippo Illuminato
 Antonio Locatelli (thrice awarded)
 Orlando Lorenzini
 Hans-Joachim Marseille
 Giulio Martinat
 Paolino Mattina
 Umberto Masotto
 Corrado Mazzoni
 Domenico Millelire
 Tito Minniti
 Roland Morillot
 Pore Mosulishvili
 Joachim Müncheberg
 Luigi Arbib Pascucci
 Pietro Pedranzini
 Sandro Pertini
 Luigi Reverberi
 Giovanni Romero
 Luigi Rizzo (twice awarded)
 Fulco Ruffo di Calabria
 Luigi Antonio Tami
 Teseo Tesei
 Virginia Tonelli
 Enrico Toti
 Leandro Verì
 Luigi Viviani

Military units 
The first military unit awarded a Gold Medal was His Majesty's Dragoons Regiment (Reggimento Dragoni di Sua Maestà) on 21 April 1796 for unit's conduct during the Battle of Mondovì. Although at the time the Medal was exclusively awarded for personal bravery, King Victor Amadeus III of Sardinia ordered the regiment's standard to be decorated with two medals for saving his army from Napoleon's attack. Until 1859, when the rules for awarding the Gold Medal were expanded to include cities and military units, only the "Cuneo" Brigade was awarded a Special Gold Medal of Military Valour by King Charles Felix of Sardinia for suppressing the Revolution of 1821. The first unit to be awarded the Gold Medal after 1859 was the French Imperial 3rd Zouaves Regiment  for its conduct in the Battle of Palestro. The latest unit awarded the Gold Medal was the Jewish Brigade in 2017 for the brigade's service during the Italian Campaign of World War II.

The following list contains only the military units, which were awarded the Gold Medal of Military Valour twice. In total 112 gold medals were awarded to units of the Italian army: 105 to regiments and 7 to battalions.

 His Majesty's Dragoons Regiment (1796 Battle of Mondovì, the only cavalry unit to be awarded twice)
 1st Regiment "Granatieri di Sardegna" (1860 Siege of Gaeta, 1917 Tenth Battle of the Isonzo)
 5th Infantry Regiment "Aosta" (1859 Battle of San Martino, 1917-18 Italian Front)
 6th Infantry Regiment "Aosta" (1859 Battle of San Martino, 1917-18 Italian Front)
 9th Infantry Regiment "Regina" (1859 Battle of Palestro, 1915-16 Italian Front)
 10th Infantry Regiment "Regina" (1860 Battle of Castelfidardo, 1915-16 Italian Front)
 13th Infantry Regiment "Pinerolo" (1915-18 Italian Front, 1941 Greco-Italian War)
 47th Infantry Regiment "Ferrara" (1915-17 Italian Front, 1940-41 Greco-Italian War)
 48th Infantry Regiment "Ferrara" (1915-17 Italian Front, 1940-41 Greco-Italian War)
 80th Infantry Regiment "Roma" (1941–42, 1942-43 Eastern Front)
 84th Infantry Regiment "Venezia" (1911 Italo-Turkish War, 1943 Resistance to German forces in Yugoslavia)
 151st Infantry Regiment "Sassari" (1915–16, 1918 Italian Front)
 152nd Infantry Regiment "Sassari" (1915–16, 1918 Italian Front)
 3rd Bersaglieri Regiment (1941–42, 1942 Eastern Front; the unit is also the custodian of the medal awarded to the III Bersaglieri Cyclists Battalion in 1915–18 on the Italian Front)
 6th Bersaglieri Regiment (1942, 1942-43 Eastern Front)
 8th Bersaglieri Regiment (1941-42 Western Desert Campaign, 1943 Tunisian Campaign)
 5th Alpini Regiment (1940-41 Greco-Italian War, 1942-43 Eastern Front)
 8th Alpini Regiment (1940-41 Greco-Italian War, 1942-43 Eastern Front)
 9th Alpini Regiment (1940-41 Greco-Italian War, 1942-43 Eastern Front)
 3rd Mountain Artillery Regiment (1940-41 Greco-Italian War, 1942-43 Eastern Front, the only artillery unit to be awarded twice)

The 4th Alpini Regiment currently also displays two Gold Medals of Military Valour on its flag, however the two medals were awarded to the regiment's Alpini Battalion "Aosta", and the Alpini Skiers Battalion "Monte Cervino".

Locations 
The first geographic entity to be awarded a Gold Medal of Military Valour was the city of Vicenza in 1866 for its five days long resistance to Austrian assaults during the First Italian War of Independence. Vicenza is also the only city to be awarded the medal twice: the second time for its participation in the Italian resistance movement during World War II.

The latest city to be awarded was Varzi for the creation and defense of the Partisan Republic of Alto Tortonese between September and December 1944.

Examples:

 Region of Friuli-Venezia Giulia
 Province of Alessandria
 Province of Asti
 Province of Pordenone
 Ascoli Piceno
 Bassano del Grappa
 Lanciano
 Marzabotto
 Milan
 Modena
 Naples for the Four days of Naples in 1943
 Parma
 Varzi
 Vicenza

A full list of regions, provinces and cities, which were awarded for their bravery can be found at :it:Città decorate al valor militare per la guerra di liberazione.

University of Padua 
The University of Padua is the only educational institution which was awarded a Gold Medal of Military Valour. The university received it on 2 November 1945 for its furious resistance to German occupation in 1943–1945.

See also
Medal of Military Valor
Silver Medal of Military Valor
Bronze Medal of Military Valor
List of military decorations
Italian medals 1860-today (Italian Wikipedia)

References 
 
Ceva, Bianca (1964). Cinque anni di storia italiana 1940-1945: da lettere e diari di caduti [Five Years of Italian History 1940 - 1945: Letters and diaries of the fallen]. Edizioni di comunità. pp. 143–144. OCLC 3658871.

Military awards and decorations of Italy
Courage awards